The 2019 1000Bulbs.com 500 was a Monster Energy NASCAR Cup Series race that was held on October 13–14, 2019 at Talladega Superspeedway in Lincoln, Alabama. Contested over 188 laps on the 2.66 mile (4.2 km) superspeedway, it was the 31st race of the 2019 Monster Energy NASCAR Cup Series season, the fifth race of the Playoffs, and second race of the Round of 12. Ryan Blaney scored his first win of the season and third of his career edging out Ryan Newman by .007 seconds becoming the 6th closest finish in NASCAR history.

Report

Background

Talladega Superspeedway, originally known as Alabama International Motor Superspeedway (AIMS), is a motorsports complex located north of Talladega, Alabama. It is located on the former Anniston Air Force Base in the small city of Lincoln. The track is a tri-oval and was constructed in the 1960s by the International Speedway Corporation, a business controlled by the France family. Talladega is most known for its steep banking and the unique location of the start/finish line that's located just past the exit to pit road. The track currently hosts the NASCAR series such as the Monster Energy NASCAR Cup Series, Xfinity Series and the Gander Outdoors Truck Series. Talladega is the longest NASCAR oval with a length of  tri-oval like the Daytona International Speedway, which also is a  tri-oval.

Entry list
 (i) denotes driver who are ineligible for series driver points.
 (R) denotes rookie driver.

Practice

First practice

Final practice

Qualifying

Qualifying results

Race
Note: Stage 1 was held on Sunday, October 13, but the race was interrupted by rain after 57 laps. Stages 2 and 3 were completed on Monday, October 14.

Stage results

Stage One
Laps: 55

Stage Two
Laps: 55

Final stage results

Stage Three
Laps: 78

Race statistics
 Lead changes: 47 among 19 different drivers
 Cautions/Laps: 9 for 43
 Red flags: 1
 Time of race: 3 hours, 39 minutes and 36 seconds
 Average speed:

Media

Television
NBC Sports covered the race on the television side. Rick Allen, Jeff Burton and six-time Talladega winner Dale Earnhardt Jr. covered the race in the booth for NBC. Steve Letarte called from the NBC Peacock Pit Box on pit road. Dave Burns, Marty Snider and Kelli Stavast reported from pit lane during the race.

Radio
MRN covered the radio call for the race, which was simulcast on Sirius XM NASCAR Radio. Alex Hayden, Jeff Striegle, and Rusty Wallace called the race for MRN when the field races thru the tri-oval. Dave Moody called the action from turn 1, Mike Bagley called the action for MRN when the field races down the backstraightaway, and Dan Hubbard called the race from the Sunoco tower just outside of turn 4. Winston Kelley, Kim Coon, Steve Post, and Dillon Welch called the race for MRN from pit road.

Standings after the race

Manufacturers' Championship standings

Note: Only the first 16 positions are included for the driver standings.

References

2019 in sports in Alabama
2019 Monster Energy NASCAR Cup Series
NASCAR races at Talladega Superspeedway
October 2019 sports events in the United States